Juan Diego Alba Bolívar (born 11 September 1997 in Tuta, Boyacá) is a Colombian cyclist, who currently rides for UCI Continental team .

Major results
2018
 1st Stage 4 Vuelta a Antioquia
 1st Stage 4 Vuelta a Boyacá
2019
 3rd Overall Giro Ciclistico d'Italia
1st Stage 6
2022
 8th Overall Tour du Rwanda
 9th Overall Vuelta al Táchira
2023
 3rd Overall Vuelta al Táchira

References

External links

1997 births
Living people
Colombian male cyclists
Sportspeople from Boyacá Department
21st-century Colombian people